Guillermo Pablo Angaut (born 10 January 1965 in La Plata) is a former Argentine rugby union player. He played as a fullback. He is professionally an ophthalmologist.

Angaut played all his career at La Plata Rugby Club, from 1983 to 1999. He won the Torneo de la URBA in 1995. He was La Plata captain from 1990 to 1996.

He had seven caps for Argentina, from 1987 to 1991, without ever scoring. He was called for the 1987 Rugby World Cup, where he had his first game for the "Pumas", in the 46-15 loss to New Zealand at 1 June 1987, in Wellington. The same year he won the 1987 South American Rugby Championship. His last game for Argentina came at the 1991 Rugby World Cup in a 35-12 loss to Samoa, on 13 October 1991, in Pontypridd, Wales. He was never called again for the national team.

References

External links

1965 births
Living people
Argentine rugby union players
Argentina international rugby union players
La Plata Rugby Club players
Rugby union fullbacks
Sportspeople from La Plata